This is a partial list of unnumbered minor planets for principal provisional designations assigned during 1–15 September 2004. Since this period yielded a high number of provisional discoveries, it is further split into several standalone pages. , a total of 354 bodies remain unnumbered for this period. Objects for this year are listed on the following pages: A–B · C · D–E · F · G–H · J–O · P–Q · Ri · Rii · Riii · S · Ti · Tii · Tiii · Tiv · U–V · W–X and Y. Also see previous and next year.

R 

|- id="2004 RL201" bgcolor=#E9E9E9
| 0 ||  || MBA-M || 17.23 || 1.5 km || multiple || 2004–2022 || 06 Jan 2022 || 265 || align=left | Disc.: Farpoint Obs. || 
|- id="2004 RW201" bgcolor=#fefefe
| 0 ||  || MBA-I || 17.64 || data-sort-value="0.88" | 880 m || multiple || 2004–2022 || 27 Jan 2022 || 414 || align=left | Disc.: LINEAR || 
|- id="2004 RZ201" bgcolor=#E9E9E9
| 2 ||  || MBA-M || 18.1 || 1.0 km || multiple || 2004–2017 || 07 Nov 2017 || 59 || align=left | Disc.: SpacewatchAlt.: 2017 OG71 || 
|- id="2004 RH202" bgcolor=#E9E9E9
| 0 ||  || MBA-M || 17.1 || 2.1 km || multiple || 2002–2018 || 14 Sep 2018 || 94 || align=left | Disc.: SpacewatchAlt.: 2016 CV8 || 
|- id="2004 RJ202" bgcolor=#FA8072
| 1 ||  || MCA || 18.6 || data-sort-value="0.57" | 570 m || multiple || 2001–2019 || 07 Apr 2019 || 40 || align=left | Disc.: LINEARAdded on 17 January 2021 || 
|- id="2004 RL202" bgcolor=#d6d6d6
| 0 ||  || MBA-O || 16.66 || 2.6 km || multiple || 2004–2021 || 28 Nov 2021 || 121 || align=left | Disc.: LINEARAlt.: 2015 VR4, 2015 VL5 || 
|- id="2004 RR202" bgcolor=#E9E9E9
| 0 ||  || MBA-M || 17.5 || 1.8 km || multiple || 2002–2021 || 15 Apr 2021 || 74 || align=left | Disc.: SpacewatchAdded on 17 June 2021 || 
|- id="2004 RU202" bgcolor=#d6d6d6
| 0 ||  || MBA-O || 17.22 || 2.0 km || multiple || 2004–2021 || 03 Oct 2021 || 54 || align=left | Disc.: SpacewatchAlt.: 2021 PD55 || 
|- id="2004 RB203" bgcolor=#fefefe
| – ||  || MBA-I || 18.1 || data-sort-value="0.71" | 710 m || single || 2 days || 13 Sep 2004 || 9 || align=left | Disc.: Spacewatch || 
|- id="2004 RF203" bgcolor=#fefefe
| 0 ||  || MBA-I || 19.2 || data-sort-value="0.43" | 430 m || multiple || 2004–2020 || 15 Sep 2020 || 56 || align=left | Disc.: LPL/Spacewatch II || 
|- id="2004 RL204" bgcolor=#FA8072
| 0 ||  || MCA || 18.11 || data-sort-value="0.71" | 710 m || multiple || 2004–2021 || 10 Nov 2021 || 196 || align=left | Disc.: LPL/Spacewatch II || 
|- id="2004 RH205" bgcolor=#fefefe
| 1 ||  || MBA-I || 17.0 || 1.2 km || multiple || 2004–2021 || 18 Jan 2021 || 96 || align=left | Alt.: 2012 TK283 || 
|- id="2004 RJ205" bgcolor=#d6d6d6
| 0 ||  || MBA-O || 16.98 || 2.2 km || multiple || 2004–2022 || 08 Jan 2022 || 240 || align=left | Alt.: 2015 RX90 || 
|- id="2004 RF207" bgcolor=#E9E9E9
| 0 ||  || MBA-M || 16.84 || 1.8 km || multiple || 2004–2021 || 28 Nov 2021 || 513 || align=left | — || 
|- id="2004 RK208" bgcolor=#E9E9E9
| 0 ||  || MBA-M || 17.16 || 1.6 km || multiple || 2004–2022 || 04 Jan 2022 || 143 || align=left | — || 
|- id="2004 RC209" bgcolor=#E9E9E9
| 0 ||  || MBA-M || 17.27 || 1.0 km || multiple || 2000–2022 || 05 Jan 2022 || 67 || align=left | Disc.: LINEARAdded on 24 December 2021 || 
|- id="2004 RN209" bgcolor=#E9E9E9
| 1 ||  || MBA-M || 17.3 || 1.0 km || multiple || 2004–2020 || 15 Jun 2020 || 42 || align=left | Alt.: 2008 OH13 || 
|- id="2004 RR209" bgcolor=#E9E9E9
| 0 ||  || MBA-M || 16.93 || 1.2 km || multiple || 2000–2021 || 03 Dec 2021 || 196 || align=left | Alt.: 2010 EM119 || 
|- id="2004 RW210" bgcolor=#E9E9E9
| 0 ||  || MBA-M || 17.73 || 1.2 km || multiple || 2004–2021 || 07 Jul 2021 || 46 || align=left | — || 
|- id="2004 RW211" bgcolor=#E9E9E9
| 0 ||  || MBA-M || 17.6 || 1.3 km || multiple || 1995–2019 || 10 Jan 2019 || 46 || align=left | — || 
|- id="2004 RH212" bgcolor=#fefefe
| 0 ||  || MBA-I || 17.2 || 1.1 km || multiple || 1999–2021 || 17 Jan 2021 || 138 || align=left | Alt.: 2015 MX124 || 
|- id="2004 RT212" bgcolor=#E9E9E9
| 0 ||  || MBA-M || 16.75 || 1.9 km || multiple || 1993–2021 || 26 Oct 2021 || 154 || align=left | — || 
|- id="2004 RW212" bgcolor=#d6d6d6
| 0 ||  || MBA-O || 15.78 || 3.9 km || multiple || 2004–2022 || 21 Jan 2022 || 286 || align=left | Alt.: 2010 VX63 || 
|- id="2004 RC213" bgcolor=#E9E9E9
| 0 ||  || MBA-M || 17.99 || 1.1 km || multiple || 2004–2021 || 28 Nov 2021 || 126 || align=left | — || 
|- id="2004 RU214" bgcolor=#E9E9E9
| 0 ||  || MBA-M || 17.24 || 1.5 km || multiple || 2004–2022 || 21 Jan 2022 || 152 || align=left | — || 
|- id="2004 RP215" bgcolor=#E9E9E9
| 0 ||  || MBA-M || 16.9 || 2.3 km || multiple || 2004–2018 || 04 Dec 2018 || 150 || align=left | — || 
|- id="2004 RV215" bgcolor=#E9E9E9
| 0 ||  || MBA-M || 17.59 || 1.3 km || multiple || 2004–2022 || 05 Jan 2022 || 89 || align=left | Alt.: 2021 RC109 || 
|- id="2004 RC216" bgcolor=#E9E9E9
| 0 ||  || MBA-M || 17.51 || 1.3 km || multiple || 2004–2021 || 12 Aug 2021 || 85 || align=left | Alt.: 2017 SJ128 || 
|- id="2004 RD216" bgcolor=#d6d6d6
| 0 ||  || MBA-O || 17.02 || 2.2 km || multiple || 2004–2021 || 28 Nov 2021 || 90 || align=left | Alt.: 2015 RW86 || 
|- id="2004 RF219" bgcolor=#E9E9E9
| 0 ||  || MBA-M || 17.43 || data-sort-value="0.97" | 970 m || multiple || 2004–2020 || 11 Oct 2020 || 117 || align=left | — || 
|- id="2004 RK219" bgcolor=#E9E9E9
| 0 ||  || MBA-M || 17.30 || 1.5 km || multiple || 2004–2022 || 06 Jan 2022 || 153 || align=left | — || 
|- id="2004 RM219" bgcolor=#E9E9E9
| 0 ||  || MBA-M || 17.20 || 1.1 km || multiple || 2004–2021 || 29 Dec 2021 || 118 || align=left | — || 
|- id="2004 RS221" bgcolor=#d6d6d6
| 0 ||  || MBA-O || 16.10 || 3.4 km || multiple || 2004–2022 || 06 Jan 2022 || 416 || align=left | — || 
|- id="2004 RC222" bgcolor=#E9E9E9
| 0 ||  || MBA-M || 17.58 || 1.3 km || multiple || 2004–2021 || 31 Oct 2021 || 68 || align=left | Alt.: 2017 YM3 || 
|- id="2004 RE222" bgcolor=#d6d6d6
| 2 ||  || MBA-O || 17.2 || 2.0 km || multiple || 2004–2021 || 09 Jan 2021 || 82 || align=left | — || 
|- id="2004 RJ222" bgcolor=#fefefe
| 0 ||  || HUN || 19.3 || data-sort-value="0.41" | 410 m || multiple || 2004–2019 || 05 Jun 2019 || 43 || align=left | — || 
|- id="2004 RN222" bgcolor=#FA8072
| 0 ||  || MCA || 18.29 || data-sort-value="0.92" | 920 m || multiple || 2004–2021 || 04 Dec 2021 || 221 || align=left | — || 
|- id="2004 RP222" bgcolor=#d6d6d6
| 0 ||  || MBA-O || 16.82 || 2.4 km || multiple || 2004–2022 || 14 Jan 2022 || 376 || align=left | — || 
|- id="2004 RR223" bgcolor=#E9E9E9
| 1 ||  || MBA-M || 17.1 || 1.6 km || multiple || 2004–2019 || 27 Jan 2019 || 95 || align=left | Alt.: 2017 ME5 || 
|- id="2004 RT223" bgcolor=#E9E9E9
| – ||  || MBA-M || 17.7 || data-sort-value="0.86" | 860 m || single || 14 days || 22 Sep 2004 || 12 || align=left | — || 
|- id="2004 RA224" bgcolor=#fefefe
| – ||  || MBA-I || 17.4 || data-sort-value="0.98" | 980 m || single || 9 days || 17 Sep 2004 || 12 || align=left | — || 
|- id="2004 RH225" bgcolor=#E9E9E9
| 0 ||  || MBA-M || 18.16 || data-sort-value="0.69" | 690 m || multiple || 2004–2022 || 25 Jan 2022 || 48 || align=left | — || 
|- id="2004 RK227" bgcolor=#d6d6d6
| 0 ||  || MBA-O || 16.96 || 2.3 km || multiple || 2004–2022 || 10 Jan 2022 || 81 || align=left | Disc.: SpacewatchAdded on 17 January 2021 || 
|- id="2004 RQ228" bgcolor=#fefefe
| 2 ||  || MBA-I || 18.4 || data-sort-value="0.62" | 620 m || multiple || 2004–2016 || 22 Dec 2016 || 57 || align=left | — || 
|- id="2004 RX228" bgcolor=#fefefe
| 0 ||  || MBA-I || 18.30 || data-sort-value="0.65" | 650 m || multiple || 2004–2021 || 21 Apr 2021 || 63 || align=left | — || 
|- id="2004 RD229" bgcolor=#fefefe
| 2 ||  || MBA-I || 18.8 || data-sort-value="0.52" | 520 m || multiple || 2004–2018 || 13 Dec 2018 || 62 || align=left | — || 
|- id="2004 RG229" bgcolor=#E9E9E9
| 0 ||  || MBA-M || 17.79 || 1.2 km || multiple || 2004–2021 || 11 Aug 2021 || 58 || align=left | — || 
|- id="2004 RK229" bgcolor=#d6d6d6
| 0 ||  || MBA-O || 16.5 || 2.8 km || multiple || 2004–2021 || 05 Jan 2021 || 134 || align=left | Alt.: 2013 HA65 || 
|- id="2004 RA233" bgcolor=#E9E9E9
| 0 ||  || MBA-M || 17.5 || 1.8 km || multiple || 2004–2020 || 20 Apr 2020 || 46 || align=left | Alt.: 2010 GL177, 2013 RZ23, 2013 SC96 || 
|- id="2004 RK233" bgcolor=#fefefe
| 1 ||  || MBA-I || 18.9 || data-sort-value="0.49" | 490 m || multiple || 2001–2021 || 18 Jan 2021 || 45 || align=left | — || 
|- id="2004 RA234" bgcolor=#fefefe
| 0 ||  || MBA-I || 18.1 || data-sort-value="0.71" | 710 m || multiple || 2004–2019 || 01 Nov 2019 || 89 || align=left | — || 
|- id="2004 RK234" bgcolor=#d6d6d6
| 0 ||  || MBA-O || 16.91 || 2.3 km || multiple || 2004–2021 || 30 Nov 2021 || 134 || align=left | Alt.: 2015 RT95 || 
|- id="2004 RQ234" bgcolor=#fefefe
| 1 ||  || MBA-I || 18.7 || data-sort-value="0.54" | 540 m || multiple || 2004–2020 || 25 May 2020 || 52 || align=left | Alt.: 2014 TQ4 || 
|- id="2004 RT234" bgcolor=#fefefe
| 2 ||  || MBA-I || 18.4 || data-sort-value="0.62" | 620 m || multiple || 2004–2015 || 19 Jun 2015 || 46 || align=left | Alt.: 2008 TD128 || 
|- id="2004 RB235" bgcolor=#d6d6d6
| 0 ||  || MBA-O || 17.0 || 2.2 km || multiple || 2004–2021 || 06 Jan 2021 || 103 || align=left | — || 
|- id="2004 RC237" bgcolor=#E9E9E9
| 0 ||  || MBA-M || 18.34 || data-sort-value="0.90" | 900 m || multiple || 2004–2021 || 19 Nov 2021 || 69 || align=left | — || 
|- id="2004 RF237" bgcolor=#E9E9E9
| 0 ||  || MBA-M || 18.65 || data-sort-value="0.55" | 550 m || multiple || 2004–2022 || 27 Jan 2022 || 43 || align=left | — || 
|- id="2004 RG237" bgcolor=#fefefe
| 3 ||  || MBA-I || 19.3 || data-sort-value="0.41" | 410 m || multiple || 1997–2015 || 01 Dec 2015 || 22 || align=left | — || 
|- id="2004 RH237" bgcolor=#E9E9E9
| – ||  || MBA-M || 19.4 || data-sort-value="0.39" | 390 m || single || 6 days || 16 Sep 2004 || 9 || align=left | — || 
|- id="2004 RN237" bgcolor=#fefefe
| 1 ||  || MBA-I || 18.5 || data-sort-value="0.59" | 590 m || multiple || 2004–2019 || 20 Oct 2019 || 28 || align=left | — || 
|- id="2004 RO237" bgcolor=#E9E9E9
| 0 ||  || MBA-M || 17.2 || 1.5 km || multiple || 2004–2020 || 23 Mar 2020 || 65 || align=left | — || 
|- id="2004 RQ237" bgcolor=#E9E9E9
| 0 ||  || MBA-M || 17.63 || 1.3 km || multiple || 1996–2021 || 03 Dec 2021 || 98 || align=left | — || 
|- id="2004 RT237" bgcolor=#E9E9E9
| 2 ||  || MBA-M || 18.1 || data-sort-value="0.71" | 710 m || multiple || 2004–2021 || 06 Nov 2021 || 40 || align=left | — || 
|- id="2004 RU237" bgcolor=#fefefe
| 0 ||  || MBA-I || 18.8 || data-sort-value="0.52" | 520 m || multiple || 2004–2019 || 25 Nov 2019 || 57 || align=left | — || 
|- id="2004 RY237" bgcolor=#E9E9E9
| 0 ||  || MBA-M || 17.2 || 2.0 km || multiple || 2004–2020 || 26 Feb 2020 || 82 || align=left | — || 
|- id="2004 RB238" bgcolor=#d6d6d6
| 0 ||  || MBA-O || 17.3 || 1.9 km || multiple || 1999–2021 || 12 Jan 2021 || 79 || align=left | Alt.: 2014 OW310 || 
|- id="2004 RE238" bgcolor=#E9E9E9
| 3 ||  || MBA-M || 18.4 || 1.2 km || multiple || 2004–2013 || 25 Sep 2013 || 18 || align=left | — || 
|- id="2004 RK238" bgcolor=#fefefe
| 0 ||  || MBA-I || 18.94 || data-sort-value="0.48" | 480 m || multiple || 2004–2021 || 14 Nov 2021 || 85 || align=left | — || 
|- id="2004 RN238" bgcolor=#E9E9E9
| 0 ||  || MBA-M || 18.08 || 1.0 km || multiple || 2000–2021 || 29 Aug 2021 || 67 || align=left | — || 
|- id="2004 RP238" bgcolor=#d6d6d6
| 0 ||  || MBA-O || 17.44 || 1.8 km || multiple || 2004–2021 || 28 Nov 2021 || 52 || align=left | — || 
|- id="2004 RU238" bgcolor=#E9E9E9
| 0 ||  || MBA-M || 17.6 || 1.7 km || multiple || 2004–2020 || 27 Jan 2020 || 72 || align=left | —Added on 22 July 2020 || 
|- id="2004 RE239" bgcolor=#d6d6d6
| 4 ||  || MBA-O || 17.5 || 1.8 km || multiple || 2004–2020 || 15 Oct 2020 || 27 || align=left | Disc.: SpacewatchAdded on 11 May 2021Alt.: 2020 RN71 || 
|- id="2004 RJ239" bgcolor=#d6d6d6
| 0 ||  || MBA-O || 17.2 || 2.0 km || multiple || 2004–2019 || 19 Dec 2019 || 92 || align=left | — || 
|- id="2004 RW239" bgcolor=#d6d6d6
| 0 ||  || MBA-O || 16.25 || 3.1 km || multiple || 1996–2021 || 30 Nov 2021 || 160 || align=left | Alt.: 2010 UT5 || 
|- id="2004 RC240" bgcolor=#E9E9E9
| 0 ||  || MBA-M || 17.5 || 1.8 km || multiple || 2003–2017 || 24 Jun 2017 || 43 || align=left | — || 
|- id="2004 RH240" bgcolor=#E9E9E9
| 0 ||  || MBA-M || 17.37 || 1.9 km || multiple || 1995–2021 || 12 May 2021 || 132 || align=left | Alt.: 1995 SE82 || 
|- id="2004 RK240" bgcolor=#E9E9E9
| 0 ||  || MBA-M || 17.99 || 1.1 km || multiple || 2004–2021 || 08 Sep 2021 || 40 || align=left | — || 
|- id="2004 RQ240" bgcolor=#fefefe
| 0 ||  || MBA-I || 19.0 || data-sort-value="0.47" | 470 m || multiple || 2003–2019 || 26 Sep 2019 || 39 || align=left | Alt.: 2015 OZ26 || 
|- id="2004 RS240" bgcolor=#fefefe
| 0 ||  || MBA-I || 18.4 || data-sort-value="0.62" | 620 m || multiple || 2000–2019 || 04 Jul 2019 || 60 || align=left | Alt.: 2008 TS39 || 
|- id="2004 RT240" bgcolor=#fefefe
| – ||  || MBA-I || 18.8 || data-sort-value="0.52" | 520 m || single || 6 days || 16 Sep 2004 || 9 || align=left | — || 
|- id="2004 RZ240" bgcolor=#E9E9E9
| – ||  || MBA-M || 18.4 || data-sort-value="0.62" | 620 m || single || 6 days || 16 Sep 2004 || 9 || align=left | — || 
|- id="2004 RC241" bgcolor=#d6d6d6
| 0 ||  || MBA-O || 17.40 || 1.8 km || multiple || 2004–2021 || 06 Nov 2021 || 59 || align=left | Alt.: 2010 OU82 || 
|- id="2004 RF241" bgcolor=#fefefe
| 0 ||  || MBA-I || 17.7 || data-sort-value="0.86" | 860 m || multiple || 2000–2019 || 26 Sep 2019 || 89 || align=left | Alt.: 2012 VN52 || 
|- id="2004 RK241" bgcolor=#E9E9E9
| 0 ||  || MBA-M || 18.40 || data-sort-value="0.62" | 620 m || multiple || 2004–2022 || 27 Jan 2022 || 44 || align=left | — || 
|- id="2004 RP241" bgcolor=#fefefe
| 1 ||  || MBA-I || 19.5 || data-sort-value="0.37" | 370 m || multiple || 2000–2019 || 26 Sep 2019 || 131 || align=left | — || 
|- id="2004 RD242" bgcolor=#fefefe
| 0 ||  || MBA-I || 18.8 || data-sort-value="0.52" | 520 m || multiple || 2004–2020 || 08 Jul 2020 || 41 || align=left | — || 
|- id="2004 RM242" bgcolor=#d6d6d6
| 0 ||  || MBA-O || 16.56 || 2.7 km || multiple || 2004–2021 || 06 Nov 2021 || 133 || align=left | Alt.: 2010 OD72 || 
|- id="2004 RP242" bgcolor=#fefefe
| – ||  || MBA-I || 19.3 || data-sort-value="0.41" | 410 m || single || 6 days || 16 Sep 2004 || 9 || align=left | — || 
|- id="2004 RS242" bgcolor=#fefefe
| 0 ||  || MBA-I || 18.4 || data-sort-value="0.62" | 620 m || multiple || 2004–2019 || 02 Nov 2019 || 54 || align=left | — || 
|- id="2004 RW242" bgcolor=#FA8072
| – ||  || MCA || 19.7 || data-sort-value="0.34" | 340 m || single || 12 days || 22 Sep 2004 || 12 || align=left | — || 
|- id="2004 RF243" bgcolor=#E9E9E9
| 2 ||  || MBA-M || 18.61 || data-sort-value="0.80" | 800 m || multiple || 2004–2021 || 23 Nov 2021 || 54 || align=left | Alt.: 2021 SC31 || 
|- id="2004 RG243" bgcolor=#fefefe
| – ||  || MBA-I || 19.3 || data-sort-value="0.41" | 410 m || single || 6 days || 16 Sep 2004 || 9 || align=left | — || 
|- id="2004 RH243" bgcolor=#E9E9E9
| 2 ||  || MBA-M || 18.16 || data-sort-value="0.69" | 690 m || multiple || 2004–2021 || 28 Nov 2021 || 39 || align=left | — || 
|- id="2004 RK243" bgcolor=#d6d6d6
| – ||  || MBA-O || 17.4 || 1.8 km || single || 6 days || 16 Sep 2004 || 9 || align=left | — || 
|- id="2004 RL243" bgcolor=#d6d6d6
| 0 ||  || MBA-O || 16.8 || 2.4 km || multiple || 2004–2020 || 18 Dec 2020 || 84 || align=left | Alt.: 2014 OH181 || 
|- id="2004 RO243" bgcolor=#E9E9E9
| 2 ||  || MBA-M || 18.6 || data-sort-value="0.57" | 570 m || multiple || 2000–2020 || 14 Sep 2020 || 41 || align=left | —Added on 22 July 2020 || 
|- id="2004 RQ243" bgcolor=#d6d6d6
| 0 ||  || MBA-O || 18.10 || 1.3 km || multiple || 2004–2020 || 21 Oct 2020 || 143 || align=left | Disc.: SpacewatchAdded on 17 January 2021 || 
|- id="2004 RW243" bgcolor=#d6d6d6
| 2 ||  || MBA-O || 17.8 || 1.5 km || multiple || 2004–2020 || 11 Oct 2020 || 50 || align=left | — || 
|- id="2004 RA244" bgcolor=#E9E9E9
| 0 ||  || MBA-M || 18.45 || data-sort-value="0.86" | 860 m || multiple || 2004–2021 || 28 Sep 2021 || 60 || align=left | — || 
|- id="2004 RD244" bgcolor=#E9E9E9
| 2 ||  || MBA-M || 18.3 || data-sort-value="0.92" | 920 m || multiple || 2004–2021 || 10 Aug 2021 || 39 || align=left | — || 
|- id="2004 RE244" bgcolor=#E9E9E9
| 0 ||  || MBA-M || 17.7 || 1.6 km || multiple || 2004–2021 || 08 May 2021 || 49 || align=left | Alt.: 2021 GC104 || 
|- id="2004 RK244" bgcolor=#d6d6d6
| 0 ||  || MBA-O || 17.2 || 2.0 km || multiple || 2004–2020 || 24 Dec 2020 || 47 || align=left | — || 
|- id="2004 RM244" bgcolor=#E9E9E9
| 3 ||  || MBA-M || 19.0 || data-sort-value="0.67" | 670 m || multiple || 2004–2021 || 26 Nov 2021 || 34 || align=left | — || 
|- id="2004 RO244" bgcolor=#d6d6d6
| 1 ||  || MBA-O || 17.59 || 1.7 km || multiple || 2004–2020 || 19 Oct 2020 || 80 || align=left | Disc.: SpacewatchAdded on 17 January 2021 || 
|- id="2004 RP244" bgcolor=#d6d6d6
| 0 ||  || MBA-O || 17.2 || 2.0 km || multiple || 2004–2020 || 21 Oct 2020 || 107 || align=left | Alt.: 2007 CL74 || 
|- id="2004 RC245" bgcolor=#fefefe
| 0 ||  || MBA-I || 17.8 || data-sort-value="0.82" | 820 m || multiple || 2003–2021 || 12 Jun 2021 || 160 || align=left | — || 
|- id="2004 RH245" bgcolor=#fefefe
| 0 ||  || MBA-I || 18.3 || data-sort-value="0.65" | 650 m || multiple || 2004–2019 || 02 Nov 2019 || 45 || align=left | Alt.: 2015 RP149 || 
|- id="2004 RO245" bgcolor=#fefefe
| 1 ||  || MBA-I || 18.4 || data-sort-value="0.62" | 620 m || multiple || 2007–2015 || 03 Nov 2015 || 32 || align=left | Alt.: 2015 UA18 || 
|- id="2004 RP245" bgcolor=#E9E9E9
| 0 ||  || MBA-M || 17.80 || 1.5 km || multiple || 2004–2021 || 08 May 2021 || 46 || align=left | — || 
|- id="2004 RC246" bgcolor=#E9E9E9
| 0 ||  || MBA-M || 17.7 || 1.6 km || multiple || 2004–2020 || 16 Mar 2020 || 51 || align=left | Disc.: SpacewatchAdded on 17 January 2021 || 
|- id="2004 RR246" bgcolor=#E9E9E9
| 0 ||  || MBA-M || 17.07 || 1.1 km || multiple || 2004–2022 || 04 Jan 2022 || 56 || align=left | Disc.: LINEARAdded on 29 January 2022 || 
|- id="2004 RH247" bgcolor=#d6d6d6
| 1 ||  || MBA-O || 17.14 || 2.1 km || multiple || 2004–2021 || 03 Dec 2021 || 53 || align=left | — || 
|- id="2004 RO247" bgcolor=#E9E9E9
| 0 ||  || MBA-M || 17.01 || 2.2 km || multiple || 2004–2021 || 18 Apr 2021 || 121 || align=left | — || 
|- id="2004 RP249" bgcolor=#fefefe
| 0 ||  || MBA-I || 19.0 || data-sort-value="0.47" | 470 m || multiple || 2004–2020 || 25 Jan 2020 || 35 || align=left | — || 
|- id="2004 RV249" bgcolor=#fefefe
| 0 ||  || MBA-I || 18.9 || data-sort-value="0.49" | 490 m || multiple || 2004–2020 || 16 Dec 2020 || 33 || align=left | —Added on 22 July 2020 || 
|- id="2004 RL251" bgcolor=#FFC2E0
| 4 ||  || AMO || 22.7 || data-sort-value="0.10" | 100 m || single || 51 days || 04 Nov 2004 || 159 || align=left | Disc.: LINEAR || 
|- id="2004 RN251" bgcolor=#FFC2E0
| 6 ||  || APO || 26.1 || data-sort-value="0.021" | 21 m || single || 2 days || 17 Sep 2004 || 27 || align=left | Disc.: LINEAR || 
|- id="2004 RQ251" bgcolor=#fefefe
| 0 ||  || HUN || 18.55 || data-sort-value="0.58" | 580 m || multiple || 2003–2021 || 06 Apr 2021 || 99 || align=left | — || 
|- id="2004 RU251" bgcolor=#fefefe
| 2 ||  || HUN || 19.5 || data-sort-value="0.37" | 370 m || multiple || 2004–2020 || 16 Oct 2020 || 56 || align=left | — || 
|- id="2004 RW251" bgcolor=#d6d6d6
| 0 ||  || MBA-O || 17.34 || 1.9 km || multiple || 2004–2021 || 05 Nov 2021 || 95 || align=left | Disc.: Table Mountain Obs.Added on 21 August 2021Alt.: 2010 OU89 || 
|- id="2004 RC252" bgcolor=#FFC2E0
| 8 ||  || AMO || 21.3 || data-sort-value="0.20" | 200 m || single || 6 days || 21 Sep 2004 || 37 || align=left | Disc.: Spacewatch || 
|- id="2004 RQ252" bgcolor=#FFC2E0
| 3 ||  || APO || 22.4 || data-sort-value="0.12" | 120 m || multiple || 2004–2012 || 04 May 2012 || 97 || align=left | Disc.: SSS || 
|- id="2004 RH253" bgcolor=#E9E9E9
| 3 ||  || MBA-M || 17.6 || 1.7 km || multiple || 2004–2017 || 15 Jul 2017 || 61 || align=left | Alt.: 2013 SX76 || 
|- id="2004 RG256" bgcolor=#fefefe
| 0 ||  || MBA-I || 18.79 || data-sort-value="0.52" | 520 m || multiple || 2004–2021 || 11 Jun 2021 || 74 || align=left | — || 
|- id="2004 RH256" bgcolor=#E9E9E9
| 1 ||  || MBA-M || 18.0 || data-sort-value="0.75" | 750 m || multiple || 2004–2020 || 18 Oct 2020 || 112 || align=left | Disc.: SpacewatchAdded on 13 September 2020Alt.: 2016 NZ99 || 
|- id="2004 RY256" bgcolor=#E9E9E9
| 0 ||  || MBA-M || 17.32 || 1.9 km || multiple || 2004–2021 || 18 May 2021 || 121 || align=left | Alt.: 2013 PJ65 || 
|- id="2004 RM257" bgcolor=#E9E9E9
| 0 ||  || MBA-M || 17.86 || data-sort-value="0.80" | 800 m || multiple || 2004–2021 || 08 Dec 2021 || 58 || align=left | — || 
|- id="2004 RB258" bgcolor=#fefefe
| 0 ||  || MBA-I || 17.9 || data-sort-value="0.78" | 780 m || multiple || 2004–2019 || 22 Oct 2019 || 75 || align=left | Alt.: 2011 KA28 || 
|- id="2004 RD258" bgcolor=#FA8072
| 1 ||  || MCA || 19.2 || data-sort-value="0.43" | 430 m || multiple || 2004–2020 || 15 Oct 2020 || 107 || align=left | — || 
|- id="2004 RG258" bgcolor=#d6d6d6
| 0 ||  || MBA-O || 17.15 || 2.1 km || multiple || 2004–2021 || 10 Oct 2021 || 90 || align=left | Disc.: SpacewatchAdded on 9 March 2021Alt.: 2010 UD39 || 
|- id="2004 RP258" bgcolor=#fefefe
| – ||  || MBA-I || 19.7 || data-sort-value="0.34" | 340 m || single || 12 days || 22 Sep 2004 || 9 || align=left | — || 
|- id="2004 RT258" bgcolor=#fefefe
| 0 ||  || MBA-I || 18.0 || data-sort-value="0.75" | 750 m || multiple || 2004–2021 || 05 Feb 2021 || 34 || align=left | Disc.: SpacewatchAdded on 29 January 2022 || 
|- id="2004 RV258" bgcolor=#E9E9E9
| 0 ||  || MBA-M || 17.8 || data-sort-value="0.82" | 820 m || multiple || 2004–2021 || 28 Nov 2021 || 58 || align=left | Disc.: SpacewatchAdded on 29 January 2022 || 
|- id="2004 RW258" bgcolor=#fefefe
| 0 ||  || MBA-I || 18.3 || data-sort-value="0.65" | 650 m || multiple || 2004–2021 || 17 Feb 2021 || 47 || align=left | Disc.: SpacewatchAdded on 21 August 2021 || 
|- id="2004 RX258" bgcolor=#fefefe
| 0 ||  || MBA-I || 18.2 || data-sort-value="0.68" | 680 m || multiple || 2004–2019 || 25 Oct 2019 || 40 || align=left | Alt.: 2015 NR15 || 
|- id="2004 RZ258" bgcolor=#E9E9E9
| 0 ||  || MBA-M || 17.45 || 1.8 km || multiple || 2004–2021 || 09 Apr 2021 || 73 || align=left | Disc.: SpacewatchAdded on 11 May 2021Alt.: 2012 GV15, 2021 CX16 || 
|- id="2004 RB259" bgcolor=#fefefe
| 1 ||  || MBA-I || 19.5 || data-sort-value="0.37" | 370 m || multiple || 2004–2020 || 21 Oct 2020 || 41 || align=left | — || 
|- id="2004 RH259" bgcolor=#d6d6d6
| 0 ||  || MBA-O || 17.0 || 2.2 km || multiple || 2004–2020 || 13 Sep 2020 || 41 || align=left | Disc.: SpacewatchAdded on 19 October 2020Alt.: 2015 TQ282 || 
|- id="2004 RK259" bgcolor=#fefefe
| 0 ||  || MBA-I || 17.9 || data-sort-value="0.78" | 780 m || multiple || 2000–2020 || 07 Dec 2020 || 54 || align=left | — || 
|- id="2004 RQ259" bgcolor=#E9E9E9
| 0 ||  || MBA-M || 17.88 || 1.1 km || multiple || 2003–2021 || 31 Aug 2021 || 99 || align=left | Alt.: 2003 KK24, 2011 DL37 || 
|- id="2004 RT259" bgcolor=#E9E9E9
| 0 ||  || MBA-M || 17.55 || data-sort-value="0.92" | 920 m || multiple || 2004–2021 || 02 Dec 2021 || 109 || align=left | Alt.: 2010 HR121 || 
|- id="2004 RV259" bgcolor=#E9E9E9
| 0 ||  || MBA-M || 17.89 || 1.1 km || multiple || 2004–2021 || 07 Oct 2021 || 95 || align=left | — || 
|- id="2004 RY259" bgcolor=#E9E9E9
| 0 ||  || MBA-M || 18.61 || data-sort-value="0.80" | 800 m || multiple || 2004–2021 || 26 Oct 2021 || 84 || align=left | —Added on 22 July 2020Alt.: 2017 UT52 || 
|- id="2004 RC260" bgcolor=#E9E9E9
| 0 ||  || MBA-M || 18.55 || data-sort-value="0.82" | 820 m || multiple || 2004–2021 || 06 Nov 2021 || 36 || align=left | Disc.: SpacewatchAdded on 5 November 2021 || 
|- id="2004 RD260" bgcolor=#E9E9E9
| – ||  || MBA-M || 18.9 || data-sort-value="0.70" | 700 m || single || 14 days || 24 Sep 2004 || 9 || align=left | — || 
|- id="2004 RF260" bgcolor=#E9E9E9
| 0 ||  || MBA-M || 17.73 || data-sort-value="0.85" | 850 m || multiple || 2004–2021 || 09 Dec 2021 || 45 || align=left | — || 
|- id="2004 RG260" bgcolor=#E9E9E9
| 0 ||  || MBA-M || 17.48 || 1.8 km || multiple || 2004–2021 || 09 May 2021 || 72 || align=left | — || 
|- id="2004 RK260" bgcolor=#fefefe
| 3 ||  || MBA-I || 19.4 || data-sort-value="0.39" | 390 m || multiple || 2004–2017 || 01 Sep 2017 || 26 || align=left | Disc.: SpacewatchAdded on 19 October 2020 || 
|- id="2004 RP260" bgcolor=#E9E9E9
| 0 ||  || MBA-M || 17.3 || 1.5 km || multiple || 2004–2020 || 02 Feb 2020 || 88 || align=left | — || 
|- id="2004 RU260" bgcolor=#d6d6d6
| 0 ||  || MBA-O || 16.7 || 2.5 km || multiple || 1999–2021 || 17 Jan 2021 || 69 || align=left | — || 
|- id="2004 RV260" bgcolor=#E9E9E9
| 0 ||  || MBA-M || 17.67 || 1.6 km || multiple || 2004–2021 || 07 Apr 2021 || 70 || align=left | Alt.: 2011 CH37 || 
|- id="2004 RB261" bgcolor=#d6d6d6
| 0 ||  || MBA-O || 17.2 || 2.0 km || multiple || 2004–2021 || 16 Jan 2021 || 103 || align=left | Alt.: 2014 US40 || 
|- id="2004 RC261" bgcolor=#fefefe
| 0 ||  || MBA-I || 17.80 || data-sort-value="0.82" | 820 m || multiple || 2004–2021 || 15 Apr 2021 || 97 || align=left | — || 
|- id="2004 RK261" bgcolor=#E9E9E9
| 0 ||  || MBA-M || 17.7 || 1.6 km || multiple || 2002–2020 || 26 Jan 2020 || 56 || align=left | Alt.: 2013 QO42 || 
|- id="2004 RM261" bgcolor=#E9E9E9
| 0 ||  || MBA-M || 17.77 || data-sort-value="0.83" | 830 m || multiple || 2004–2021 || 09 Dec 2021 || 78 || align=left | — || 
|- id="2004 RQ261" bgcolor=#d6d6d6
| – ||  || MBA-O || 18.9 || data-sort-value="0.92" | 920 m || single || 6 days || 16 Sep 2004 || 9 || align=left | — || 
|- id="2004 RS261" bgcolor=#E9E9E9
| 0 ||  || MBA-M || 17.8 || 1.5 km || multiple || 2004–2020 || 01 Feb 2020 || 44 || align=left | — || 
|- id="2004 RZ261" bgcolor=#E9E9E9
| 1 ||  || MBA-M || 18.0 || 1.1 km || multiple || 2004–2019 || 28 Jan 2019 || 28 || align=left | —Added on 22 July 2020 || 
|- id="2004 RB262" bgcolor=#E9E9E9
| 0 ||  || MBA-M || 17.88 || 1.5 km || multiple || 2004–2021 || 08 May 2021 || 39 || align=left | —Added on 22 July 2020 || 
|- id="2004 RC262" bgcolor=#d6d6d6
| 0 ||  || MBA-O || 17.3 || 1.9 km || multiple || 2004–2019 || 27 Nov 2019 || 72 || align=left | Alt.: 2007 EL161, 2016 CL162 || 
|- id="2004 RJ262" bgcolor=#fefefe
| 0 ||  || MBA-I || 19.08 || data-sort-value="0.45" | 450 m || multiple || 2004–2021 || 14 Nov 2021 || 80 || align=left | —Added on 22 July 2020Alt.: 2014 QZ189 || 
|- id="2004 RK262" bgcolor=#d6d6d6
| 0 ||  || MBA-O || 17.39 || 1.9 km || multiple || 2004–2022 || 25 Jan 2022 || 72 || align=left | — || 
|- id="2004 RM262" bgcolor=#fefefe
| – ||  || MBA-I || 19.2 || data-sort-value="0.43" | 430 m || single || 14 days || 24 Sep 2004 || 15 || align=left | — || 
|- id="2004 RN262" bgcolor=#E9E9E9
| 1 ||  || MBA-M || 19.04 || data-sort-value="0.46" | 460 m || multiple || 2004–2020 || 13 Sep 2020 || 42 || align=left | Alt.: 2016 PC179 || 
|- id="2004 RT262" bgcolor=#E9E9E9
| 2 ||  || MBA-M || 18.6 || 1.1 km || multiple || 2004–2013 || 03 Aug 2013 || 18 || align=left | — || 
|- id="2004 RY262" bgcolor=#fefefe
| 0 ||  || MBA-I || 19.3 || data-sort-value="0.41" | 410 m || multiple || 2004–2019 || 29 Sep 2019 || 32 || align=left | —Added on 22 July 2020Alt.: 2015 PW110 || 
|- id="2004 RA263" bgcolor=#d6d6d6
| 0 ||  || MBA-O || 16.8 || 2.4 km || multiple || 2004–2021 || 08 Apr 2021 || 185 || align=left | Alt.: 2007 GV72, 2007 HK113, 2016 DK14 || 
|- id="2004 RF263" bgcolor=#E9E9E9
| 1 ||  || MBA-M || 18.15 || data-sort-value="0.99" | 990 m || multiple || 2004–2021 || 30 May 2021 || 44 || align=left | Disc.: SpacewatchAdded on 17 June 2021Alt.: 2021 GX22 || 
|- id="2004 RL263" bgcolor=#E9E9E9
| 0 ||  || MBA-M || 17.40 || 1.8 km || multiple || 2004–2021 || 13 May 2021 || 77 || align=left | — || 
|- id="2004 RR263" bgcolor=#fefefe
| 0 ||  || MBA-I || 18.6 || data-sort-value="0.57" | 570 m || multiple || 2004–2019 || 17 Dec 2019 || 66 || align=left | Alt.: 2008 WS105, 2015 VE14 || 
|- id="2004 RV263" bgcolor=#fefefe
| 4 ||  || MBA-I || 18.8 || data-sort-value="0.52" | 520 m || multiple || 2004–2015 || 07 Nov 2015 || 16 || align=left | — || 
|- id="2004 RY263" bgcolor=#E9E9E9
| E ||  || MBA-M || 18.9 || data-sort-value="0.70" | 700 m || single || 7 days || 16 Sep 2004 || 12 || align=left | — || 
|- id="2004 RA264" bgcolor=#fefefe
| 3 ||  || MBA-I || 18.9 || data-sort-value="0.49" | 490 m || multiple || 2004–2019 || 24 Oct 2019 || 21 || align=left | —Added on 22 July 2020 || 
|- id="2004 RT264" bgcolor=#E9E9E9
| 0 ||  || MBA-M || 17.71 || 1.6 km || multiple || 2004–2021 || 09 May 2021 || 49 || align=left | Disc.: SpacewatchAdded on 17 January 2021 || 
|- id="2004 RV264" bgcolor=#fefefe
| 0 ||  || MBA-I || 18.17 || data-sort-value="0.69" | 690 m || multiple || 2004–2021 || 10 Oct 2021 || 136 || align=left | Alt.: 2011 UV326, 2014 OU264 || 
|- id="2004 RH265" bgcolor=#d6d6d6
| 0 ||  || MBA-O || 17.18 || 2.0 km || multiple || 2004–2022 || 12 Jan 2022 || 82 || align=left | Alt.: 2015 UE50 || 
|- id="2004 RJ265" bgcolor=#d6d6d6
| 0 ||  || MBA-O || 17.3 || 1.9 km || multiple || 2004–2019 || 08 Nov 2019 || 94 || align=left | — || 
|- id="2004 RT265" bgcolor=#fefefe
| 1 ||  || MBA-I || 18.3 || data-sort-value="0.65" | 650 m || multiple || 2004–2019 || 03 Dec 2019 || 55 || align=left | Alt.: 2008 UP223, 2014 FM31 || 
|- id="2004 RU265" bgcolor=#E9E9E9
| 1 ||  || MBA-M || 18.0 || data-sort-value="0.75" | 750 m || multiple || 2004–2020 || 15 Sep 2020 || 38 || align=left | — || 
|- id="2004 RW265" bgcolor=#E9E9E9
| 0 ||  || MBA-M || 17.29 || 1.5 km || multiple || 2004–2021 || 07 Nov 2021 || 188 || align=left | —Added on 22 July 2020 || 
|- id="2004 RX265" bgcolor=#d6d6d6
| 0 ||  || MBA-O || 17.09 || 2.1 km || multiple || 2004–2022 || 25 Jan 2022 || 101 || align=left | Alt.: 2017 BA49 || 
|- id="2004 RA266" bgcolor=#E9E9E9
| 0 ||  || MBA-M || 17.94 || 1.1 km || multiple || 1998–2021 || 09 Jul 2021 || 44 || align=left | —Added on 22 July 2020 || 
|- id="2004 RG266" bgcolor=#E9E9E9
| 2 ||  || MBA-M || 17.9 || 1.1 km || multiple || 2004–2017 || 11 Oct 2017 || 25 || align=left | — || 
|- id="2004 RM266" bgcolor=#fefefe
| 3 ||  || MBA-I || 20.2 || data-sort-value="0.27" | 270 m || multiple || 2004–2014 || 02 Oct 2014 || 19 || align=left | — || 
|- id="2004 RO266" bgcolor=#d6d6d6
| 0 ||  || MBA-O || 17.2 || 2.0 km || multiple || 2004–2020 || 15 Dec 2020 || 78 || align=left | — || 
|- id="2004 RP266" bgcolor=#fefefe
| 0 ||  || MBA-I || 18.6 || data-sort-value="0.57" | 570 m || multiple || 2004–2019 || 28 Nov 2019 || 50 || align=left | — || 
|- id="2004 RU266" bgcolor=#fefefe
| 0 ||  || MBA-I || 18.56 || data-sort-value="0.58" | 580 m || multiple || 2004–2021 || 07 Feb 2021 || 45 || align=left | Alt.: 2014 EJ118 || 
|- id="2004 RW266" bgcolor=#d6d6d6
| 2 ||  || MBA-O || 17.9 || 1.5 km || multiple || 2004–2019 || 28 Nov 2019 || 35 || align=left | —Added on 22 July 2020 || 
|- id="2004 RO267" bgcolor=#fefefe
| 0 ||  || MBA-I || 18.3 || data-sort-value="0.65" | 650 m || multiple || 2004–2019 || 27 Oct 2019 || 85 || align=left | — || 
|- id="2004 RU267" bgcolor=#d6d6d6
| 0 ||  || MBA-O || 17.17 || 2.0 km || multiple || 2004–2021 || 27 Nov 2021 || 71 || align=left | — || 
|- id="2004 RV267" bgcolor=#d6d6d6
| 0 ||  || MBA-O || 16.59 || 2.7 km || multiple || 2004–2021 || 27 Oct 2021 || 85 || align=left | Alt.: 2010 TN159 || 
|- id="2004 RW267" bgcolor=#E9E9E9
| 0 ||  || MBA-M || 17.2 || 2.0 km || multiple || 1995–2018 || 08 Sep 2018 || 59 || align=left | Alt.: 2014 WM387 || 
|- id="2004 RX267" bgcolor=#E9E9E9
| 0 ||  || MBA-M || 18.32 || data-sort-value="0.91" | 910 m || multiple || 2004–2021 || 27 Sep 2021 || 78 || align=left | — || 
|- id="2004 RZ267" bgcolor=#d6d6d6
| 0 ||  || MBA-O || 16.79 || 2.4 km || multiple || 2004–2021 || 30 Sep 2021 || 80 || align=left | Disc.: SpacewatchAdded on 17 June 2021 || 
|- id="2004 RH268" bgcolor=#E9E9E9
| 0 ||  || MBA-M || 18.01 || 1.1 km || multiple || 2004–2021 || 03 Sep 2021 || 48 || align=left | —Added on 22 July 2020 || 
|- id="2004 RL268" bgcolor=#E9E9E9
| – ||  || MBA-M || 18.7 || data-sort-value="0.76" | 760 m || single || 5 days || 16 Sep 2004 || 9 || align=left | — || 
|- id="2004 RN268" bgcolor=#E9E9E9
| 0 ||  || MBA-M || 17.82 || 1.1 km || multiple || 2004–2021 || 10 Oct 2021 || 115 || align=left | Alt.: 2010 AT143 || 
|- id="2004 RQ268" bgcolor=#d6d6d6
| 0 ||  || MBA-O || 17.4 || 1.8 km || multiple || 2004–2019 || 02 Nov 2019 || 71 || align=left | — || 
|- id="2004 RR268" bgcolor=#E9E9E9
| E ||  || MBA-M || 18.6 || data-sort-value="0.80" | 800 m || single || 5 days || 16 Sep 2004 || 13 || align=left | — || 
|- id="2004 RS268" bgcolor=#fefefe
| 0 ||  || MBA-I || 18.8 || data-sort-value="0.52" | 520 m || multiple || 2002–2018 || 15 Sep 2018 || 51 || align=left | Alt.: 2011 SA31 || 
|- id="2004 RA269" bgcolor=#E9E9E9
| 0 ||  || MBA-M || 17.89 || 1.1 km || multiple || 2004–2021 || 31 Aug 2021 || 83 || align=left | Alt.: 2010 FH137, 2017 UF18 || 
|- id="2004 RB269" bgcolor=#fefefe
| 0 ||  || MBA-I || 18.1 || data-sort-value="0.71" | 710 m || multiple || 2004–2019 || 08 Nov 2019 || 77 || align=left | — || 
|- id="2004 RD269" bgcolor=#E9E9E9
| 0 ||  || MBA-M || 16.85 || 2.4 km || multiple || 2002–2021 || 13 May 2021 || 153 || align=left | Alt.: 2013 SJ10, 2016 AJ119 || 
|- id="2004 RE269" bgcolor=#E9E9E9
| – ||  || MBA-M || 17.9 || 1.5 km || single || 11 days || 22 Sep 2004 || 9 || align=left | — || 
|- id="2004 RN269" bgcolor=#fefefe
| 0 ||  || MBA-I || 18.09 || data-sort-value="0.72" | 720 m || multiple || 2000–2022 || 25 Jan 2022 || 86 || align=left | Alt.: 2008 TD13 || 
|- id="2004 RR269" bgcolor=#d6d6d6
| 0 ||  || MBA-O || 17.2 || 2.0 km || multiple || 2004–2019 || 05 Nov 2019 || 80 || align=left | — || 
|- id="2004 RW269" bgcolor=#fefefe
| 0 ||  || MBA-I || 18.0 || data-sort-value="0.75" | 750 m || multiple || 2004–2020 || 07 Dec 2020 || 86 || align=left | Alt.: 2008 TX60 || 
|- id="2004 RY269" bgcolor=#d6d6d6
| 0 ||  || MBA-O || 17.2 || 2.0 km || multiple || 2004–2020 || 01 Jan 2020 || 34 || align=left | — || 
|- id="2004 RZ269" bgcolor=#d6d6d6
| 1 ||  || MBA-O || 17.5 || 1.8 km || multiple || 1994–2019 || 02 Nov 2019 || 75 || align=left | — || 
|- id="2004 RC270" bgcolor=#d6d6d6
| 1 ||  || MBA-O || 18.5 || 1.1 km || multiple || 2004–2020 || 21 Sep 2020 || 48 || align=left | Disc.: SpacewatchAdded on 19 October 2020 || 
|- id="2004 RD270" bgcolor=#E9E9E9
| 0 ||  || MBA-M || 17.2 || 2.0 km || multiple || 1997–2021 || 07 Jun 2021 || 106 || align=left | Alt.: 2011 DH7, 2016 FL20 || 
|- id="2004 RH270" bgcolor=#d6d6d6
| 1 ||  || MBA-O || 17.4 || 1.8 km || multiple || 2004–2020 || 17 Dec 2020 || 46 || align=left | Alt.: 2014 OW68 || 
|- id="2004 RJ270" bgcolor=#fefefe
| 2 ||  || MBA-I || 19.1 || data-sort-value="0.45" | 450 m || multiple || 2004–2018 || 22 Aug 2018 || 41 || align=left | — || 
|- id="2004 RL270" bgcolor=#fefefe
| 0 ||  || MBA-I || 18.9 || data-sort-value="0.49" | 490 m || multiple || 2004–2019 || 01 Nov 2019 || 56 || align=left | — || 
|- id="2004 RO270" bgcolor=#d6d6d6
| 1 ||  || MBA-O || 17.6 || 1.7 km || multiple || 2004–2021 || 11 Nov 2021 || 25 || align=left | Disc.: SpacewatchAdded on 29 January 2022 || 
|- id="2004 RS270" bgcolor=#E9E9E9
| 0 ||  || MBA-M || 17.5 || 1.8 km || multiple || 2004–2020 || 02 Feb 2020 || 49 || align=left | — || 
|- id="2004 RX270" bgcolor=#E9E9E9
| 0 ||  || MBA-M || 17.95 || 1.1 km || multiple || 2004–2021 || 28 Sep 2021 || 54 || align=left | — || 
|- id="2004 RZ270" bgcolor=#fefefe
| 4 ||  || MBA-I || 19.3 || data-sort-value="0.41" | 410 m || multiple || 2004–2015 || 18 Nov 2015 || 17 || align=left | Disc.: SpacewatchAdded on 30 September 2021 || 
|- id="2004 RF271" bgcolor=#E9E9E9
| 3 ||  || MBA-M || 18.6 || 1.1 km || multiple || 2004–2018 || 15 Oct 2018 || 24 || align=left | Disc.: SpacewatchAdded on 19 October 2020 || 
|- id="2004 RQ271" bgcolor=#E9E9E9
| 2 ||  || MBA-M || 19.0 || data-sort-value="0.47" | 470 m || multiple || 2004–2020 || 23 Sep 2020 || 62 || align=left | Disc.: SpacewatchAdded on 19 October 2020 || 
|- id="2004 RR271" bgcolor=#fefefe
| 3 ||  || MBA-I || 19.0 || data-sort-value="0.47" | 470 m || multiple || 2004–2015 || 02 Nov 2015 || 26 || align=left | Alt.: 2015 VY14 || 
|- id="2004 RV271" bgcolor=#d6d6d6
| 0 ||  || MBA-O || 18.1 || 1.3 km || multiple || 2004–2020 || 10 Dec 2020 || 28 || align=left | Disc.: SpacewatchAdded on 9 March 2021 || 
|- id="2004 RX271" bgcolor=#d6d6d6
| 1 ||  || MBA-O || 16.9 || 2.3 km || multiple || 2002–2019 || 24 Oct 2019 || 102 || align=left | Alt.: 2014 SY336, 2017 FM129 || 
|- id="2004 RF272" bgcolor=#E9E9E9
| 0 ||  || MBA-M || 18.77 || data-sort-value="0.52" | 520 m || multiple || 2004–2021 || 09 Nov 2021 || 46 || align=left | — || 
|- id="2004 RH272" bgcolor=#fefefe
| 1 ||  || MBA-I || 18.5 || data-sort-value="0.59" | 590 m || multiple || 2004–2020 || 16 Mar 2020 || 34 || align=left | — || 
|- id="2004 RJ272" bgcolor=#d6d6d6
| 2 ||  || MBA-O || 17.6 || 1.7 km || multiple || 2004–2019 || 23 Sep 2019 || 169 || align=left | — || 
|- id="2004 RK272" bgcolor=#E9E9E9
| 0 ||  || MBA-M || 18.58 || data-sort-value="0.81" | 810 m || multiple || 2004–2021 || 09 Aug 2021 || 40 || align=left | Disc.: SpacewatchAdded on 21 August 2021Alt.: 2013 WW86 || 
|- id="2004 RM272" bgcolor=#d6d6d6
| 1 ||  || MBA-O || 17.9 || 1.5 km || multiple || 2004–2020 || 10 Nov 2020 || 30 || align=left | Disc.: SpacewatchAdded on 17 January 2021 || 
|- id="2004 RP272" bgcolor=#E9E9E9
| 0 ||  || MBA-M || 17.41 || 1.8 km || multiple || 2004–2021 || 14 Apr 2021 || 66 || align=left | — || 
|- id="2004 RC273" bgcolor=#E9E9E9
| 0 ||  || MBA-M || 18.43 || data-sort-value="0.61" | 610 m || multiple || 2004–2021 || 25 Nov 2021 || 36 || align=left | Disc.: SpacewatchAdded on 29 January 2022 || 
|- id="2004 RJ273" bgcolor=#E9E9E9
| 0 ||  || MBA-M || 17.97 || data-sort-value="0.76" | 760 m || multiple || 2004–2021 || 25 Nov 2021 || 63 || align=left | Alt.: 2013 WW95 || 
|- id="2004 RM273" bgcolor=#E9E9E9
| 0 ||  || MBA-M || 17.42 || 1.8 km || multiple || 2004–2021 || 15 Apr 2021 || 73 || align=left | — || 
|- id="2004 RN273" bgcolor=#fefefe
| 0 ||  || MBA-I || 18.6 || data-sort-value="0.57" | 570 m || multiple || 2004–2019 || 08 Jun 2019 || 34 || align=left | — || 
|- id="2004 RR273" bgcolor=#E9E9E9
| 0 ||  || MBA-M || 17.24 || 2.0 km || multiple || 2004–2021 || 09 May 2021 || 63 || align=left | — || 
|- id="2004 RU273" bgcolor=#fefefe
| 0 ||  || MBA-I || 18.8 || data-sort-value="0.52" | 520 m || multiple || 2002–2018 || 14 Aug 2018 || 34 || align=left | Disc.: SpacewatchAdded on 21 August 2021 || 
|- id="2004 RL274" bgcolor=#E9E9E9
| 0 ||  || MBA-M || 17.96 || data-sort-value="0.76" | 760 m || multiple || 2004–2021 || 06 Nov 2021 || 83 || align=left | —Added on 22 July 2020Alt.: 2013 WL75 || 
|- id="2004 RM274" bgcolor=#E9E9E9
| 0 ||  || MBA-M || 17.73 || 1.2 km || multiple || 2004–2021 || 06 Oct 2021 || 152 || align=left | — || 
|- id="2004 RN274" bgcolor=#d6d6d6
| 2 ||  || MBA-O || 18.5 || 1.1 km || multiple || 2004–2020 || 17 Oct 2020 || 30 || align=left | Disc.: SpacewatchAdded on 17 January 2021 || 
|- id="2004 RS274" bgcolor=#fefefe
| 2 ||  || MBA-I || 18.9 || data-sort-value="0.49" | 490 m || multiple || 2004–2019 || 02 Nov 2019 || 37 || align=left | — || 
|- id="2004 RU274" bgcolor=#fefefe
| 0 ||  || MBA-I || 19.39 || data-sort-value="0.39" | 390 m || multiple || 2004–2021 || 31 Oct 2021 || 41 || align=left | Disc.: LPL/Spacewatch IIAdded on 5 November 2021 || 
|- id="2004 RW274" bgcolor=#E9E9E9
| 0 ||  || MBA-M || 17.76 || 1.6 km || multiple || 2004–2021 || 08 Jun 2021 || 68 || align=left | Disc.: LPL/Spacewatch IIAdded on 17 January 2021Alt.: 2007 GB60, 2016 EM171 || 
|- id="2004 RY274" bgcolor=#E9E9E9
| 0 ||  || MBA-M || 17.88 || 1.5 km || multiple || 2004–2021 || 15 Apr 2021 || 61 || align=left | Alt.: 2010 AQ150, 2014 WM465 || 
|- id="2004 RK275" bgcolor=#fefefe
| 3 ||  || MBA-I || 18.4 || data-sort-value="0.62" | 620 m || multiple || 2004–2020 || 10 Dec 2020 || 37 || align=left | —Added on 24 August 2020 || 
|- id="2004 RT275" bgcolor=#fefefe
| 1 ||  || MBA-I || 18.3 || data-sort-value="0.65" | 650 m || multiple || 2004–2019 || 18 Sep 2019 || 65 || align=left | — || 
|- id="2004 RU275" bgcolor=#fefefe
| 0 ||  || MBA-I || 18.31 || data-sort-value="0.65" | 650 m || multiple || 2004–2021 || 06 Nov 2021 || 86 || align=left | — || 
|- id="2004 RY275" bgcolor=#d6d6d6
| 0 ||  || MBA-O || 17.06 || 3.4 km || multiple || 2004–2021 || 27 Nov 2021 || 118 || align=left | Alt.: 2010 OQ62 || 
|- id="2004 RK276" bgcolor=#fefefe
| 1 ||  || MBA-I || 18.1 || data-sort-value="0.71" | 710 m || multiple || 2004–2019 || 17 Dec 2019 || 88 || align=left | Alt.: 2008 VR40 || 
|- id="2004 RX276" bgcolor=#fefefe
| 0 ||  || MBA-I || 18.3 || data-sort-value="0.65" | 650 m || multiple || 2004–2019 || 02 Nov 2019 || 58 || align=left | — || 
|- id="2004 RK277" bgcolor=#d6d6d6
| 0 ||  || MBA-O || 17.3 || 1.9 km || multiple || 2004–2021 || 13 Jan 2021 || 44 || align=left | — || 
|- id="2004 RL277" bgcolor=#E9E9E9
| 0 ||  || MBA-M || 18.24 || data-sort-value="0.67" | 670 m || multiple || 2004–2021 || 11 Nov 2021 || 67 || align=left | —Added on 22 July 2020 || 
|- id="2004 RU277" bgcolor=#fefefe
| 1 ||  || MBA-I || 18.9 || data-sort-value="0.49" | 490 m || multiple || 2004–2019 || 03 Dec 2019 || 32 || align=left | Disc.: SpacewatchAdded on 30 September 2021Alt.: 2008 WZ122 || 
|- id="2004 RV277" bgcolor=#E9E9E9
| 0 ||  || MBA-M || 17.11 || 2.1 km || multiple || 2000–2021 || 13 Apr 2021 || 137 || align=left | Alt.: 2011 BH138, 2014 XO35 || 
|- id="2004 RZ277" bgcolor=#FA8072
| 0 ||  || MCA || 19.0 || data-sort-value="0.47" | 470 m || multiple || 2004–2020 || 24 Oct 2020 || 48 || align=left | Alt.: 2020 OX95 || 
|- id="2004 RL278" bgcolor=#fefefe
| 0 ||  || MBA-I || 18.5 || data-sort-value="0.59" | 590 m || multiple || 2001–2021 || 16 Jan 2021 || 68 || align=left | Disc.: SpacewatchAdded on 17 January 2021 || 
|- id="2004 RM278" bgcolor=#fefefe
| 0 ||  || MBA-I || 18.6 || data-sort-value="0.57" | 570 m || multiple || 2004–2020 || 16 Jun 2020 || 100 || align=left | — || 
|- id="2004 RP278" bgcolor=#E9E9E9
| 0 ||  || MBA-M || 17.49 || 1.3 km || multiple || 2004–2021 || 08 Sep 2021 || 119 || align=left | Alt.: 2012 LO9 || 
|- id="2004 RQ278" bgcolor=#d6d6d6
| 0 ||  || MBA-O || 16.98 || 2.2 km || multiple || 2004–2021 || 09 Sep 2021 || 62 || align=left | Alt.: 2010 TD93 || 
|- id="2004 RU278" bgcolor=#E9E9E9
| 0 ||  || MBA-M || 17.43 || 1.8 km || multiple || 2004–2021 || 15 Apr 2021 || 83 || align=left | — || 
|- id="2004 RW278" bgcolor=#E9E9E9
| 0 ||  || MBA-M || 17.5 || 1.8 km || multiple || 1995–2021 || 07 Jun 2021 || 66 || align=left | Alt.: 2013 RS46 || 
|- id="2004 RA279" bgcolor=#E9E9E9
| 0 ||  || MBA-M || 17.47 || 1.8 km || multiple || 2004–2021 || 01 May 2021 || 83 || align=left | — || 
|- id="2004 RE279" bgcolor=#E9E9E9
| 0 ||  || MBA-M || 17.7 || 1.6 km || multiple || 1995–2018 || 05 Oct 2018 || 47 || align=left | — || 
|- id="2004 RH279" bgcolor=#E9E9E9
| 0 ||  || MBA-M || 18.69 || data-sort-value="0.54" | 540 m || multiple || 2000–2021 || 09 Dec 2021 || 52 || align=left | Disc.: SpacewatchAdded on 24 December 2021 || 
|- id="2004 RK279" bgcolor=#fefefe
| 0 ||  || MBA-I || 18.24 || data-sort-value="0.67" | 670 m || multiple || 2004–2021 || 07 Apr 2021 || 146 || align=left | Alt.: 2008 VF35 || 
|- id="2004 RN279" bgcolor=#E9E9E9
| 0 ||  || MBA-M || 18.12 || data-sort-value="0.71" | 710 m || multiple || 2004–2021 || 30 Nov 2021 || 64 || align=left | Disc.: SpacewatchAdded on 24 December 2021 || 
|- id="2004 RO279" bgcolor=#d6d6d6
| 0 ||  || MBA-O || 17.24 || 2.0 km || multiple || 2004–2021 || 31 Oct 2021 || 49 || align=left | Alt.: 2015 RB198 || 
|- id="2004 RA280" bgcolor=#fefefe
| 0 ||  || MBA-I || 18.5 || data-sort-value="0.59" | 590 m || multiple || 2004–2020 || 26 Jan 2020 || 39 || align=left | — || 
|- id="2004 RC280" bgcolor=#E9E9E9
| 0 ||  || MBA-M || 17.98 || data-sort-value="0.75" | 750 m || multiple || 2000–2021 || 12 Nov 2021 || 79 || align=left | —Added on 24 August 2020Alt.: 2020 JM5 || 
|- id="2004 RF280" bgcolor=#fefefe
| 0 ||  || MBA-I || 18.16 || data-sort-value="0.69" | 690 m || multiple || 2004–2021 || 07 Apr 2021 || 104 || align=left | — || 
|- id="2004 RG280" bgcolor=#fefefe
| 0 ||  || MBA-I || 18.7 || data-sort-value="0.54" | 540 m || multiple || 2000–2019 || 29 Oct 2019 || 47 || align=left | — || 
|- id="2004 RH280" bgcolor=#d6d6d6
| 1 ||  || MBA-O || 17.7 || 1.6 km || multiple || 2004–2020 || 11 Sep 2020 || 37 || align=left | — || 
|- id="2004 RQ280" bgcolor=#d6d6d6
| 0 ||  || MBA-O || 16.5 || 2.8 km || multiple || 2004–2020 || 23 Oct 2020 || 88 || align=left | Alt.: 2014 QM107 || 
|- id="2004 RX280" bgcolor=#E9E9E9
| 0 ||  || MBA-M || 17.57 || 1.3 km || multiple || 2004–2021 || 03 Oct 2021 || 138 || align=left | Alt.: 2011 EB99 || 
|- id="2004 RZ280" bgcolor=#d6d6d6
| 0 ||  || MBA-O || 17.3 || 1.9 km || multiple || 2002–2021 || 16 Jan 2021 || 74 || align=left | — || 
|- id="2004 RG281" bgcolor=#E9E9E9
| 0 ||  || MBA-M || 17.2 || 2.0 km || multiple || 2004–2020 || 02 Feb 2020 || 90 || align=left | Alt.: 2018 VO10 || 
|- id="2004 RN281" bgcolor=#fefefe
| 2 ||  || MBA-I || 19.1 || data-sort-value="0.45" | 450 m || multiple || 1997–2018 || 30 Oct 2018 || 47 || align=left | Alt.: 2009 BC60, 2011 SV235 || 
|- id="2004 RO281" bgcolor=#E9E9E9
| 0 ||  || MBA-M || 17.86 || data-sort-value="0.80" | 800 m || multiple || 2002–2021 || 09 Dec 2021 || 104 || align=left | Alt.: 2010 AG1 || 
|- id="2004 RY281" bgcolor=#d6d6d6
| 0 ||  || MBA-O || 17.62 || 1.7 km || multiple || 2004–2021 || 07 Nov 2021 || 38 || align=left | — || 
|- id="2004 RC282" bgcolor=#E9E9E9
| 0 ||  || MBA-M || 17.4 || 1.8 km || multiple || 2004–2020 || 02 Feb 2020 || 75 || align=left | — || 
|- id="2004 RD282" bgcolor=#d6d6d6
| 0 ||  || MBA-O || 16.13 || 3.3 km || multiple || 2004–2021 || 27 Nov 2021 || 261 || align=left | — || 
|- id="2004 RE282" bgcolor=#fefefe
| 0 ||  || MBA-I || 19.57 || data-sort-value="0.36" | 360 m || multiple || 2004–2021 || 02 Oct 2021 || 51 || align=left | Alt.: 2007 HX114 || 
|- id="2004 RH282" bgcolor=#E9E9E9
| 1 ||  || MBA-M || 18.41 || data-sort-value="0.87" | 870 m || multiple || 2004–2021 || 30 Aug 2021 || 32 || align=left | — || 
|- id="2004 RR282" bgcolor=#E9E9E9
| 0 ||  || MBA-M || 17.5 || 1.8 km || multiple || 1995–2020 || 13 May 2020 || 72 || align=left | Alt.: 1995 SD80, 2015 CT43 || 
|- id="2004 RX282" bgcolor=#fefefe
| 1 ||  || MBA-I || 19.17 || data-sort-value="0.44" | 440 m || multiple || 2004–2018 || 05 Oct 2018 || 37 || align=left | Disc.: SpacewatchAdded on 21 August 2021 || 
|- id="2004 RB283" bgcolor=#d6d6d6
| 2 ||  || MBA-O || 18.4 || 1.2 km || multiple || 2004–2019 || 26 Sep 2019 || 39 || align=left | Alt.: 2009 SP309 || 
|- id="2004 RG283" bgcolor=#fefefe
| 4 ||  || MBA-I || 20.0 || data-sort-value="0.30" | 300 m || multiple || 2004–2020 || 23 Sep 2020 || 26 || align=left | Disc.: SpacewatchAdded on 17 June 2021Alt.: 2020 QO56 || 
|- id="2004 RH283" bgcolor=#fefefe
| 0 ||  || MBA-I || 19.57 || data-sort-value="0.36" | 360 m || multiple || 2004–2021 || 08 Aug 2021 || 42 || align=left | — || 
|- id="2004 RK283" bgcolor=#d6d6d6
| 0 ||  || MBA-O || 17.01 || 2.2 km || multiple || 1993–2021 || 27 Nov 2021 || 102 || align=left | Alt.: 2010 VH254 || 
|- id="2004 RM283" bgcolor=#E9E9E9
| 0 ||  || MBA-M || 17.0 || 2.2 km || multiple || 2004–2020 || 27 Jan 2020 || 70 || align=left | Alt.: 2013 SS92 || 
|- id="2004 RS283" bgcolor=#E9E9E9
| 0 ||  || MBA-M || 18.67 || data-sort-value="0.78" | 780 m || multiple || 2004–2021 || 26 Oct 2021 || 58 || align=left | Disc.: SpacewatchAdded on 30 September 2021 || 
|- id="2004 RW283" bgcolor=#d6d6d6
| 0 ||  || MBA-O || 16.2 || 3.2 km || multiple || 2004–2020 || 07 Dec 2020 || 138 || align=left | — || 
|- id="2004 RZ283" bgcolor=#E9E9E9
| 0 ||  || MBA-M || 17.52 || data-sort-value="0.93" | 930 m || multiple || 2004–2021 || 25 Nov 2021 || 136 || align=left | Alt.: 2011 FA76 || 
|- id="2004 RC284" bgcolor=#fefefe
| 0 ||  || MBA-I || 17.6 || data-sort-value="0.90" | 900 m || multiple || 1995–2021 || 18 Jan 2021 || 197 || align=left | Alt.: 2006 DP218, 2006 EJ75 || 
|- id="2004 RM284" bgcolor=#E9E9E9
| 1 ||  || MBA-M || 18.2 || data-sort-value="0.68" | 680 m || multiple || 2000–2020 || 11 Sep 2020 || 66 || align=left | — || 
|- id="2004 RQ284" bgcolor=#E9E9E9
| 0 ||  || MBA-M || 18.53 || data-sort-value="0.83" | 830 m || multiple || 2004–2021 || 01 Jul 2021 || 23 || align=left | — || 
|- id="2004 RR284" bgcolor=#E9E9E9
| 0 ||  || MBA-M || 18.07 || 1.0 km || multiple || 2004–2021 || 27 Oct 2021 || 90 || align=left | — || 
|- id="2004 RS284" bgcolor=#d6d6d6
| 0 ||  || MBA-O || 16.9 || 2.3 km || multiple || 2004–2021 || 16 Jan 2021 || 124 || align=left | Alt.: 2007 ER221 || 
|- id="2004 RU284" bgcolor=#E9E9E9
| 0 ||  || MBA-M || 17.98 || data-sort-value="0.75" | 750 m || multiple || 2002–2021 || 03 Dec 2021 || 45 || align=left | Disc.: SpacewatchAdded on 24 December 2021 || 
|- id="2004 RD285" bgcolor=#fefefe
| 0 ||  || MBA-I || 18.2 || data-sort-value="0.68" | 680 m || multiple || 2004–2019 || 03 Oct 2019 || 50 || align=left | Alt.: 2008 UA198, 2012 XW124 || 
|- id="2004 RE285" bgcolor=#E9E9E9
| 0 ||  || MBA-M || 17.40 || 1.4 km || multiple || 2004–2021 || 24 Oct 2021 || 65 || align=left | — || 
|- id="2004 RH285" bgcolor=#d6d6d6
| 0 ||  || MBA-O || 16.4 || 2.9 km || multiple || 2004–2021 || 13 Oct 2021 || 93 || align=left | Disc.: SpacewatchAdded on 30 September 2021Alt.: 2010 OC86, 2015 PL301 || 
|- id="2004 RP285" bgcolor=#d6d6d6
| 0 ||  || MBA-O || 17.36 || 1.9 km || multiple || 2004–2021 || 27 Oct 2021 || 54 || align=left | —Added on 24 August 2020Alt.: 2015 PS151 || 
|- id="2004 RX285" bgcolor=#E9E9E9
| 0 ||  || MBA-M || 17.75 || 1.6 km || multiple || 2004–2021 || 07 Apr 2021 || 57 || align=left | — || 
|- id="2004 RH286" bgcolor=#fefefe
| 0 ||  || MBA-I || 18.91 || data-sort-value="0.49" | 490 m || multiple || 2001–2022 || 27 Jan 2022 || 72 || align=left | Alt.: 2014 UO104, 2016 FK29 || 
|- id="2004 RL286" bgcolor=#E9E9E9
| 1 ||  || MBA-M || 18.5 || data-sort-value="0.59" | 590 m || multiple || 1992–2020 || 11 Oct 2020 || 88 || align=left | Alt.: 2012 PO43 || 
|- id="2004 RM287" bgcolor=#fefefe
| 0 ||  || MBA-I || 18.52 || data-sort-value="0.59" | 590 m || multiple || 2001–2021 || 30 Oct 2021 || 87 || align=left | Disc.: Leiden Obs.Added on 30 September 2021Alt.: 2014 NJ45 || 
|- id="2004 RS288" bgcolor=#d6d6d6
| 0 ||  || MBA-O || 17.2 || 2.0 km || multiple || 2002–2021 || 18 Jan 2021 || 114 || align=left | Alt.: 2014 UP81 || 
|- id="2004 RU288" bgcolor=#fefefe
| 3 ||  || MBA-I || 18.8 || data-sort-value="0.52" | 520 m || multiple || 2004–2018 || 11 Aug 2018 || 37 || align=left | — || 
|- id="2004 RW288" bgcolor=#E9E9E9
| 0 ||  || MBA-M || 17.95 || 1.1 km || multiple || 2004–2021 || 27 Sep 2021 || 44 || align=left | Disc.: Saint-SulpiceAdded on 19 October 2020 || 
|- id="2004 RY288" bgcolor=#E9E9E9
| 0 ||  || MBA-M || 17.2 || 2.0 km || multiple || 2004–2020 || 25 Jan 2020 || 74 || align=left | Alt.: 2014 WZ463 || 
|- id="2004 RA289" bgcolor=#E9E9E9
| 0 ||  || MBA-M || 17.47 || 1.8 km || multiple || 2004–2021 || 13 May 2021 || 69 || align=left | Alt.: 2007 GP81 || 
|- id="2004 RJ289" bgcolor=#fefefe
| 0 ||  || HUN || 17.81 || data-sort-value="0.81" | 810 m || multiple || 2001–2022 || 25 Jan 2022 || 94 || align=left | Alt.: 2015 SL8 || 
|- id="2004 RS289" bgcolor=#fefefe
| 0 ||  || MBA-I || 17.7 || data-sort-value="0.86" | 860 m || multiple || 2004–2019 || 27 Oct 2019 || 58 || align=left | — || 
|- id="2004 RG290" bgcolor=#E9E9E9
| 0 ||  || MBA-M || 18.02 || data-sort-value="0.74" | 740 m || multiple || 2004–2022 || 06 Jan 2022 || 46 || align=left | Alt.: 2008 PZ12 || 
|- id="2004 RK290" bgcolor=#E9E9E9
| 0 ||  || MBA-M || 16.8 || 1.8 km || multiple || 2004–2020 || 22 Mar 2020 || 72 || align=left | — || 
|- id="2004 RR292" bgcolor=#fefefe
| 1 ||  || MBA-I || 18.9 || data-sort-value="0.49" | 490 m || multiple || 1997–2021 || 11 Jun 2021 || 62 || align=left | — || 
|- id="2004 RG293" bgcolor=#fefefe
| 1 ||  || MBA-I || 18.4 || data-sort-value="0.62" | 620 m || multiple || 1993–2018 || 12 Jul 2018 || 28 || align=left | Disc.: LINEARAdded on 19 October 2020 || 
|- id="2004 RL293" bgcolor=#E9E9E9
| 0 ||  || MBA-M || 17.97 || data-sort-value="0.76" | 760 m || multiple || 1999–2021 || 26 Oct 2021 || 105 || align=left | — || 
|- id="2004 RB294" bgcolor=#d6d6d6
| 0 ||  || MBA-O || 17.0 || 2.2 km || multiple || 2002–2020 || 05 Dec 2020 || 61 || align=left | — || 
|- id="2004 RF294" bgcolor=#FA8072
| – ||  || MCA || 20.6 || data-sort-value="0.32" | 320 m || single || 10 days || 21 Sep 2004 || 12 || align=left | — || 
|- id="2004 RG294" bgcolor=#E9E9E9
| 0 ||  || MBA-M || 17.17 || 2.0 km || multiple || 2000–2021 || 11 May 2021 || 109 || align=left | — || 
|- id="2004 RL294" bgcolor=#d6d6d6
| 4 ||  || MBA-O || 17.9 || 1.5 km || multiple || 2004–2020 || 23 Sep 2020 || 26 || align=left | Disc.: SpacewatchAdded on 17 January 2021 || 
|- id="2004 RO294" bgcolor=#fefefe
| 1 ||  || MBA-I || 18.3 || data-sort-value="0.65" | 650 m || multiple || 2000–2020 || 23 Nov 2020 || 37 || align=left | — || 
|- id="2004 RS294" bgcolor=#d6d6d6
| 1 ||  || MBA-O || 17.1 || 2.1 km || multiple || 2004–2019 || 06 Sep 2019 || 73 || align=left | Alt.: 2014 QB211 || 
|- id="2004 RV294" bgcolor=#d6d6d6
| 0 ||  || MBA-O || 17.3 || 1.9 km || multiple || 2004–2021 || 17 Jan 2021 || 71 || align=left | — || 
|- id="2004 RZ294" bgcolor=#d6d6d6
| 0 ||  || MBA-O || 17.75 || 1.6 km || multiple || 2004–2021 || 28 Nov 2021 || 60 || align=left | Disc.: SpacewatchAdded on 5 November 2021 || 
|- id="2004 RB295" bgcolor=#E9E9E9
| 0 ||  || MBA-M || 18.44 || data-sort-value="0.61" | 610 m || multiple || 2004–2022 || 07 Jan 2022 || 30 || align=left | Disc.: SpacewatchAdded on 5 November 2021 || 
|- id="2004 RE295" bgcolor=#E9E9E9
| 0 ||  || MBA-M || 17.6 || 1.3 km || multiple || 2004–2021 || 27 Nov 2021 || 136 || align=left | — || 
|- id="2004 RG295" bgcolor=#fefefe
| 1 ||  || MBA-I || 19.74 || data-sort-value="0.34" | 340 m || multiple || 2004–2021 || 07 Oct 2021 || 32 || align=left | Disc.: SpacewatchAdded on 5 November 2021 || 
|- id="2004 RH295" bgcolor=#d6d6d6
| 0 ||  || MBA-O || 17.24 || 2.0 km || multiple || 2004–2022 || 25 Jan 2022 || 52 || align=left | Alt.: 2014 OH284 || 
|- id="2004 RL295" bgcolor=#E9E9E9
| 2 ||  || MBA-M || 18.06 || data-sort-value="0.73" | 730 m || multiple || 2004–2021 || 30 Nov 2021 || 46 || align=left | — || 
|- id="2004 RS295" bgcolor=#fefefe
| 0 ||  || MBA-I || 18.4 || data-sort-value="0.62" | 620 m || multiple || 2004–2019 || 26 Nov 2019 || 57 || align=left | Alt.: 2007 JF30 || 
|- id="2004 RT295" bgcolor=#E9E9E9
| 3 ||  || MBA-M || 18.6 || 1.1 km || multiple || 2004–2013 || 08 Oct 2013 || 20 || align=left | — || 
|- id="2004 RZ295" bgcolor=#E9E9E9
| 0 ||  || MBA-M || 17.7 || 1.2 km || multiple || 2004–2020 || 22 Apr 2020 || 35 || align=left | Disc.: SpacewatchAdded on 21 August 2021 || 
|- id="2004 RA296" bgcolor=#fefefe
| 4 ||  || MBA-I || 19.1 || data-sort-value="0.45" | 450 m || multiple || 2004–2015 || 07 Nov 2015 || 20 || align=left | — || 
|- id="2004 RC296" bgcolor=#fefefe
| 4 ||  || MBA-I || 19.2 || data-sort-value="0.43" | 430 m || multiple || 2004–2015 || 13 Nov 2015 || 17 || align=left | Disc.: SpacewatchAdded on 19 October 2020 || 
|- id="2004 RO296" bgcolor=#fefefe
| 2 ||  || MBA-I || 18.9 || data-sort-value="0.49" | 490 m || multiple || 2004–2019 || 20 Dec 2019 || 44 || align=left | — || 
|- id="2004 RS296" bgcolor=#fefefe
| – ||  || MBA-I || 19.4 || data-sort-value="0.39" | 390 m || single || 10 days || 21 Sep 2004 || 9 || align=left | — || 
|- id="2004 RW296" bgcolor=#d6d6d6
| 0 ||  || MBA-O || 17.0 || 2.2 km || multiple || 2004–2020 || 08 Dec 2020 || 105 || align=left | Alt.: 2007 ET21, 2010 XH5 || 
|- id="2004 RD297" bgcolor=#d6d6d6
| 0 ||  || MBA-O || 16.97 || 2.2 km || multiple || 2000–2021 || 04 Oct 2021 || 71 || align=left | Alt.: 2019 JS13 || 
|- id="2004 RE297" bgcolor=#fefefe
| 0 ||  || MBA-I || 18.72 || data-sort-value="0.54" | 540 m || multiple || 2004–2021 || 12 May 2021 || 51 || align=left | — || 
|- id="2004 RG297" bgcolor=#d6d6d6
| 0 ||  || MBA-O || 17.0 || 2.2 km || multiple || 2004–2020 || 19 Dec 2020 || 83 || align=left | — || 
|- id="2004 RQ297" bgcolor=#E9E9E9
| 0 ||  || MBA-M || 18.1 || 1.0 km || multiple || 2004–2017 || 17 Aug 2017 || 33 || align=left | — || 
|- id="2004 RX297" bgcolor=#fefefe
| 0 ||  || MBA-I || 18.57 || data-sort-value="0.57" | 570 m || multiple || 2004–2021 || 15 Apr 2021 || 36 || align=left | — || 
|- id="2004 RY297" bgcolor=#E9E9E9
| 0 ||  || MBA-M || 17.8 || 1.5 km || multiple || 2004–2017 || 30 Jul 2017 || 44 || align=left | Disc.: SpacewatchAdded on 19 October 2020Alt.: 2013 TO22 || 
|- id="2004 RD298" bgcolor=#E9E9E9
| 0 ||  || MBA-M || 17.66 || 1.2 km || multiple || 2004–2021 || 08 Nov 2021 || 109 || align=left | — || 
|- id="2004 RK298" bgcolor=#d6d6d6
| 2 ||  || MBA-O || 17.69 || 1.6 km || multiple || 2004–2021 || 07 Nov 2021 || 41 || align=left | Disc.: SpacewatchAdded on 19 October 2020 || 
|- id="2004 RP298" bgcolor=#fefefe
| 3 ||  || MBA-I || 18.9 || data-sort-value="0.49" | 490 m || multiple || 2004–2018 || 12 Nov 2018 || 40 || align=left | — || 
|- id="2004 RQ298" bgcolor=#fefefe
| 0 ||  || MBA-I || 19.03 || data-sort-value="0.46" | 460 m || multiple || 2004–2021 || 12 Jun 2021 || 33 || align=left | — || 
|- id="2004 RF299" bgcolor=#fefefe
| 0 ||  || MBA-I || 18.1 || data-sort-value="0.71" | 710 m || multiple || 2004–2019 || 29 Sep 2019 || 74 || align=left | Alt.: 2008 SW272 || 
|- id="2004 RG299" bgcolor=#E9E9E9
| 0 ||  || MBA-M || 16.8 || 2.4 km || multiple || 2004–2020 || 26 Jan 2020 || 80 || align=left | — || 
|- id="2004 RJ299" bgcolor=#d6d6d6
| 2 ||  || MBA-O || 18.02 || 1.4 km || multiple || 2004–2021 || 28 Nov 2021 || 24 || align=left | — || 
|- id="2004 RO299" bgcolor=#fefefe
| 0 ||  || MBA-I || 17.92 || data-sort-value="0.77" | 770 m || multiple || 1997–2021 || 05 Jun 2021 || 106 || align=left | Alt.: 2015 UZ28 || 
|- id="2004 RR299" bgcolor=#E9E9E9
| 0 ||  || MBA-M || 17.79 || data-sort-value="0.82" | 820 m || multiple || 2004–2022 || 25 Jan 2022 || 57 || align=left | Disc.: SpacewatchAdded on 29 January 2022 || 
|- id="2004 RZ299" bgcolor=#d6d6d6
| 1 ||  || MBA-O || 17.2 || 2.0 km || multiple || 2004–2021 || 03 Oct 2021 || 32 || align=left | Disc.: SpacewatchAdded on 29 January 2022 || 
|}
back to top

References 
 

Lists of unnumbered minor planets